Norway competed at the 1992 Winter Olympics in Albertville, France.

As Lillehammer would be hosting the following Winter Olympics, a Norwegian segment was performed at the closing ceremony.

Medalists

Competitors
The following is the list of number of competitors in the Games.

Alpine skiing

Men

Men's combined

Women

Women's combined

Biathlon

Men

Men's 4 × 7.5 km relay

Women

Women's 3 × 7.5 km relay

 1 A penalty loop of 150 metres had to be skied per missed target.
 2 One minute added per missed target.

Bobsleigh

Cross-country skiing

Men

 1 Starting delay based on 10 km results. 
 C = Classical style, F = Freestyle

Men's 4 × 10 km relay

Women

 2 Starting delay based on 5 km results. 
 C = Classical style, F = Freestyle

Women's 4 × 5 km relay

Curling

Curling was a demonstration sport at the 1992 Winter Olympics.

Figure skating

Men

Freestyle skiing

Women

Ice hockey

Group B
Twelve participating teams were placed in two groups. After playing a round-robin, the top four teams in each group advanced to the Medal Round while the last two teams competed in the consolation round for the 9th to 12th places.

Consolation round 9th-12th places

9th place match

Contestants
Steve Allman
Jim Marthinsen
Robert Schistad
Petter Salsten
Kim Søgaard
Geir Hoff
Tommy Jakobsen
Jon-Magne Karlstad
Jan-Roar Fagerli
Morgan Andersen
Rune Gulliksen
Martin Friis
Petter Thoresen
Marius Rath
Tom Johansen
Ørjan Løvdal
Øystein Olsen
Arne Billkvam
Erik Kristiansen
Jarle Friis
Carl Gunnar Gundersen
Ole Eskild Dahlstrøm
Eirik Paulsen
Head coach: Bengt Ohlson

Luge

(Men's) Doubles

Nordic combined 

Men's individual

Events:
 normal hill ski jumping 
 15 km cross-country skiing 

Men's Team

Three participants per team.

Events:
 normal hill ski jumping 
 10 km cross-country skiing

Short track speed skating

Men

Ski jumping 

Men's team large hill

 1 Four teams members performed two jumps each. The best three were counted.

Speed skating

Men

Women

References

 Official Olympic Reports
 International Olympic Committee results database
 Olympic Winter Games 1992, full results by sports-reference.com

Nations at the 1992 Winter Olympics
1992
Winter Olympics